Wrestling is a grappling sport.

Wrestling may also refer to:

 Amateur wrestling
 Freestyle wrestling
 Greco-Roman wrestling
 Professional wrestling
 Styles of wrestling
 Wrestling (1961 film), a Canadian documentary
 Wrestling (2008 film), an American romantic drama
 The Wrestling, a 1996 nonfiction book by Simon Garfield
 Wrestling (album), a 2021 album by Kučka
 Wrestling Brewster, one of the passengers on the Mayflower
 "Wrestling", a 2007 episode of Zoey 101

See also
The Wrestler (disambiguation)